The 1996 season of the Toppserien, the highest women's football (soccer) league in Norway, began on 21 April 1996 and ended on 13 October 1996.

18 games were played with 3 points given for wins and 1 for draws. Number nine and ten were relegated, while two teams from the First Division were promoted through a playoff round. After the season had ended, Sprint/Jeløy changed its name to Athene Moss.

Trondheims-Ørn won the league, losing only one game.

League table

Top goalscorers
 27 goals:
  Randi Leinan, Trondheims-Ørn
 12 goals:
  Marianne Pettersen, Gjelleråsen
  Silvi Jan, Kolbotn
  Åse Iren Steine, Sandviken
 11 goals:
  Anne Nymark Andersen, Sandviken
 10 goals:
  Hege Gunnerød, Asker
  Kjersti Thun, Asker
  Britt Monica Andreassen, Bøler
  Unni Lehn, Trondheims-Ørn
 9 goals:
  Heidi Eivik, Trondheims-Ørn
  Brit Sandaune, Trondheims-Ørn
 8 goals:
  Katrin Skarsbø, Sprint/Jeløy

Promotion and relegation
 Haugar and Gjelleråsen were relegated to the 1. divisjon.
 Verdal and Bjørnar were promoted from the 1. divisjon through play-offs.

References

League table
Fixtures
Goalscorers

Top level Norwegian women's football league seasons
1
Nor
Nor